The Egba people are a subgroup of the Yoruba people, an ethnic group of western Nigeria, a majority of whom are from the central part of Ogun State that is Ogun Central Senatorial District.

Ogun Central Senatorial District comprises six local government areas in Ogun State: Abeokuta North, Abeokuta South, Ewekoro, Ifo, Obafemi Owode and Odeda local governments.

Etymology 
The origination of the word Egba is disputed. The first meaning may come from the word Ẹ̀gbálugbó, meaning wanderers towards the forest, and this comes from the fact that the ancestors of the Egba people came from the region of the Oyo Empire to the "Egba Forest" and formed what we now know as the city of Abeokuta. The "Egbalugbo" were in conjunction with the Ẹ̀gbáluwẹ or Ẹ̀gbálodó, meaning the wanderers towards the river, who later shortened their name to "Egbado," another subethnic group of the Yoruba. Another possible meaning may come from the word Ẹsẹ̀gbá, the title of a chief which led several groups of the Egba to their present location.

History 
The Egba group, originally under the Oyo Empire, became independent following the spectacular collapse of Oyo in the first half of the 19th century. Wars with the Dahomey, in which the Egba were successful partly due to the protection afforded by the Olumo Rock, led to the founding of the city of Abeokuta, which literally means "under the rock".

The Egba nation is made up of the following subdivisions: the Ake, Owu, Oke Ona and Gbagura, each with its own king. (Historically, the Egba nation is made up of these four divisions; Ibara, though geographically located in Abeokuta as well, is part of Yewaland.) During colonial rule the British recognised the  Alake (or King of Ake) as the paramount ruler of the whole clan and their territory, and so, his successor is now referred to as the Alake of Egbaland. The titles of the kings of the aforementioned subdivisions are therefore Alake of Egbaland, Oshile of Oke Ona, Agura of Gbagura, and Olowu of Owu, in order of settlement and seniority in the Egba nation.

It is worthy of note that the original town and settlement of the Egba nation in Egbaland was under and around Olumo Rock, which is in the Ikija/Ikereku area of the Egba Oke Ona,  The Jagunna of Itoko, an Oke Ona chief, is the high priest of Olumo.  Olumo Rock is in the territory of and under the control of the Itokos.

Another reference name for Abeokuta by the founding fathers is Oko Adagba (Adagba's Farm) in reference to the hunter that discovered Olumo Rock.  Adagba went hunting in search of game animals from the Obantoko township where his fellow Itoko citizens were stationed while wandering for a settlement. He then came across the mountain.

Egbaland was where Henry Townsend lived, and was also the home of the first newspaper in Nigeria (Iwe Iroyin). Its people went on to serve as the first of the many Nigerian nations (until recently, the only one of them) to have an anthem.

Egba anthem 
Lori oke o'un petele
Ibe l'agbe bi mi o
Ibe l'agbe to mi d'agba oo
Ile ominira

Chorus: Maa yo, maa yo, maa yo o; l'Ori Olumo; Maa yo, maa yo, maa yo o; l'Ori Olumo

Abeokuta ilu Egba
N ko ni gbagbe e re
N o gbe o l'eke okan mi
Bii ilu odo oya
Emi o f'Abeokuta sogo 
N o duro l'ori Olumo
Maayo l'oruko Egba ooo 
Emi omoo Lisabi
E e

Chorus: Maa yo, maa yo, maa yo o; l'Ori Olumo; Maa yo, maa yo, maa yo o; l'Ori Olumo

Emi o maayo l'ori Olumo
Emi o s'ogoo yi l'okan mi
Wipe ilu olokiki o
L'awa Egba n gbe

Chorus: Maa yo, maa yo, maa yo o; l'Ori Olumo; Maa yo, maa yo, maa yo o; l'Ori Olumo

Traditional attire 
 
 Men: 
 Trousers, kembe/sokoto
 Top, Buba and Agbada
 Cap, Fila (abeti aja)
 Women: 
 Wrapper (Iro)
 Blouse(Buba)
 Headgear /Headtie (Gele)
 Other: Ipele - Piece of cloth placed on the shoulder or wrapped around the waist

Notable individuals
 Ladapo Ademola, the Alake of Abeokuta from 1920 to 1962, member of the Egba council. Also, a leading figure in negotiations with the Lagos State colonial government.
 Adegboyega Edun, a clergyman, teacher, principal and government administrator; the Secretary of the Egba United Government
 Chief Moshood Kashimawo Olawale Abiola, a businessman and politician
 Akin Fayomi, Nigerian diplomat, ambassador to France, Monaco, Liberia
 Chief Olusegun Obasanjo, President of Nigeria from 1999 to 2007
 Chief Ebenezer Olasupo Obey-Fabiyi, a musician and evangelist
 Olufela Olusegun Oludotun Ransome-Kuti, a musician and activist
 Chief Olufunmilayo Ransome-Kuti, a human rights activist and the "Mother of the Nation"
 Reverend Oludotun Israel Ransome-Kuti, clergyman, a teacher and principal (April 30, 1891 – April 6, 1955)
 Professor Olikoye Ransome-Kuti, a pediatrician, activist, and health minister (30 December 1927 – 1 June 2003)
 Chief Ernest Shonekan, Interim President of Nigeria, 26 August 1993 – 17 November 1993
 Prof. Wole Soyinka, an author, activist and Nobel laureate
 Chief F. R. A. Williams S.A.N., a lawyer. 
 Adewale Oke Adekola, civil engineer, academic, author, and administrator
 Pastor Tunde Bakare, a lawyer and renowned pastor
 Mr. Kolawole Banmeke, Former Lagos State Head of Service and Secretary to Government, 1985 - 1988
 Tunde Kelani, a cinematographer
 Segun Odegbami, a retired footballer
 Dimeji Bankole, a former speaker of Nigeria's house of representatives
 Bukola Elemide, alias Asa, a singer
 Olu Jacobs, an actor
 Shina Peters, a musician
 Alhaji Waheed Ayinla Yusuf (Omowura), a musician
 Prince Bola Ajibola, a retired world court judge
 Chief Simeon Adebo, a lawyer and diplomat
 Fela Sowande, a composer
 Chief J.F. Odunjo, Yoruba literary icon, writer of the popular Alawiye series
 Tunde Lemo, a CBN deputy governor
 John Fashanu, a retired footballer
 Femi Kuti, a musician
 Seun Kuti, a musician
Made Kuti, a musician
 Clarence Peters , a music  video director
 Ebun Oloyede, an actor
 Senator Ibikunle Amosun, governor of Ogun state from 2011 to 2019
 Chief Olusegun Osoba, a journalist and politician, governor of Ogun state from 1999 to 2003
Zainab Balogun, an actress and model
 Professor Adeoye Lambo, medical professor, former Vice Chairman of the World Health Organization (WHO) 
 Professor Saburi Biobaku, a former Vice Chancellor of the University of Lagos.

References

Further reading 
 S. O. Biobaku: The Egba and their neighbours; 1842 - 1914. Oxford 1957.

 
Yoruba subgroups
Ethnic groups in Nigeria